Norman Clyde Glacier is a small glacier located in the crest of the Sierra Nevada Range in the John Muir Wilderness of Inyo National Forest in Inyo County, California. The glacier is northwest of Norman Clyde Peak and both are named after California mountaineer Norman Clyde.

See also
List of glaciers in the United States

References

Glaciers of California
Glaciers of the Sierra Nevada (United States)
Glaciers of Inyo County, California